Tārgale is a village at the centre of Tārgale parish, Ventspils Municipality, Courland, Latvia. It is situated by the P122 road 13 km from the county council in Ventspils and 185 km from Riga.

The name of Tārgale is first mentioned in documents in the year 1230. The village has developed around the center of the Tārgale manor (Tergeln). In the palace of the manor a school was established (1942-1985), later - a kolkhoz office. In Targale there is the parish administration, a primary school, and a post office.

References

Towns and villages in Latvia
Ventspils Municipality